The 2012 Palau Soccer League was the eighth season of association football competition in Palau, and the first that has been split into two stages: the Spring League and the Fall League. The Spring League was won by Team Bangladesh. The Spring League consisted of five rounds of matches in a round robin group stage, from which the top four qualified for semi-finals, and a play-off final. According to the fixture list, the Fall League was played in the same format, only this time each team played the others twice. This is assumed to be the first season of football since 2010 as the 2011 winner is unknown.

Clubs

Spring league
 Belau Kanu Club – Founded 2012
 Biib Strykers – Founded 2012
 Kramers FC- 2008 Palau Soccer League winners
 Taj FC – Founded 2012
 Team Bangladesh – Founded 2004

Fall league
 Belau Kanu Club
 Kramers FC
 New Stars FC
 Taj FC
 Team Bangladesh

Spring league stage
The spring league consisted of one group of five teams all playing each other once. The top four then proceeded to one-legged semi-finals to determine the two teams to contest the championship.

Standings

Results

Week 1

Week 2

Week 3

Week 4

Week 5

Spring knockout stage

Semi-finals

Final

Fall league
The Fall League is played in the same manner as the Spring League, except in this iteration, the group stage will be played on both a home and away basis. Biib Strykers are not competing and have been replaced by New Stars FC.

Group stage

Results

Round 1

Round 2

Round 3

Round 4

Round 5

Round 6

Round 7

Round 8

Round 9

Round 10

Semi-finals

Final

References

External links
Official Palau Football Association Website 
Kramer's FC 3–4 Biib Strykers – 2012 Palau Football Association Adult Spring League  Highlights video

Palau Soccer League seasons
Palau
Soccer